Melam Kottu Thali Kattu is an Indian Tamil-language reality television show, broadcast on Puthuyugam TV from 2013 to 16 April 2014 aired every Saturday and Sunday 8 PM IST and Season 2 aired every Saturday 8 PM IST. It is meant for unmarried women. It includes a seven-round quiz competition with prizes such as gold and other articles required for marriage. The show is presented by actress Sneha. It also airs in Malaysia Tamil Channel on Astro Vaanavil.

Season

Seasons overview

International broadcast
  In Singapore Tamil Channel on V Thamizh HD. It aired Saturday and Sunday at 9:00PM.
  In Malaysia Tamil Channel on Astro Vaanavil. It airs every Monday at 6:00PM.

References

External links
 Puthuyugam TV official website 
 Puthuyugam TV on YouTube
 

Puthuyugam TV television series
2013 Tamil-language television series debuts
Tamil-language game shows
Tamil-language talk shows
Tamil-language television shows
2014 Tamil-language television series endings